City Press was a British newspaper published during the 19th and early-20th centuries by W H & L Collingridge Ltd.

It was founded in 1857 by William Hill Collingridge to provide a newspaper for the City of London.

See also

 List of newspapers in London

References 

1857 establishments in England
20th-century disestablishments in England
Organizations disestablished in the 20th century
Publications established in 1857
Defunct newspapers published in the United Kingdom